Strategic Forces Command (Pakistan) may refer to:

Army Strategic Forces Command (Pakistan), Pakistan Army
Naval Strategic Forces Command (Pakistan), Pakistan Navy
Air Force Strategic Command (Pakistan), Pakistan Air Force